The Chiquimula Volcanic Field is a located in the Chiquimula valley in southern Guatemala.

See also
List of volcanoes in Guatemala
Global Volcanism Program

References 

Mountains of Guatemala
Volcanoes of Guatemala
Volcanic fields